Scream Team (stylised as ScreamTeam) is a paranormal reality TV series, produced by Making Time, which was broadcast on Living TV in 2002.

Premise
A reality TV show in which six young people travelled around the UK in a large Silver campervan, investigating ghosts, folklore and supernatural locations. They were selected from over eight hundred hopefuls at auditions in the summer of 2001 in London. The team consisted of believers and sceptics of the paranormal.

Scream Team was described by its creators as a cross between The Blair Witch Project and Scooby-Doo.

It's often repeated on British satellite and cable television channels Ftn and Living TV.

An introductory episode titled Meet the Team was broadcast on 13 September 2002.

Cast
 Phil Whyman (went on to become a paranormal investigator on Living TV's Most Haunted)
 Becky Kitter
 Sheyla Shehovich
 Amy Jones
 Dan Ainsworth
 Sam Witcher

Episodes

References

External links
  on Amazon
  at MSN
 

Paranormal television
Paranormal reality television series
British supernatural television shows
Ghosts in television
2000s British reality television series
2002 British television series debuts
Sky Living original programming
UKTV original programming
English-language television shows